"Take the World by Storm" is a song by Danish soul-pop band Lukas Graham from their second studio album, Lukas Graham (Blue Album). The song was released as a digital download on 16 September 2016 by Copenhagen Records, and serves as the album's fifth single in Scandinavia.

Track listing

Charts

Release history

References

2016 songs
2016 singles
Songs written by Morten Ristorp
Songs written by Lukas Forchhammer
Songs written by Stefan Forrest
Lukas Graham songs
Songs written by Ross Golan
Copenhagen Records singles
Warner Records singles